Pat Dixon (born  1970) is an American comedian, podcaster, and journalist who lives and works in New York City. He is best known as creator and host of The NYC Crime Report with Pat Dixon.

Career

Dixon was a cast member on the reboot of VH1's Best Week Ever, and had his own half-hour Comedy Central Presents special. He’s also been seen on The Late Late Show, BBC America’s The World Stands Up, Gotham Comedy Live, TBS's Very Funny Show, and TV Land’s Best Night In.

He has released three stand-up comedy albums titled White Devil, Goodbye Forever, Fatty, and King of Clubs.

In 2015, he appeared as an actor in the short film Muck, which premiered at the Sarasota Film Festival and was also an official selection in the Palm Springs International Film Festival, the Montclair Film Festival, the Berkshire International Film Festival and the Capital City Film Festival.

Dixon is the creator of the Nearly Naked Lady Hour and the subsequent Miss Nearly Naked Lady.

The NYC Crime Report with Pat Dixon

The NYC Crime Report with Pat Dixon is a long-running podcast devoted to reporting current crime news from the New York City tabloids with irreverence and dark humor. In October 2015, it was announced Dixon was the latest addition to the Compound Media Network of podcasts and comedians. In June 2022, Dixon left Compound Media after an off-air altercation with fellow comedian and In Hot Water host Geno Bisconte. He signed with online video platform Censored.TV shortly afterwards.

The show has featured guest such as Jackie Martling, Christian Finnegan, Bobcat Goldthwait, Bonnie McFarlane, Jim Florentine, Jerry Stahl, Mandy Stadtmiller, Ari Shaffir and Kendra Sunderland.

Other ventures 

On September 3, 2020, he appeared on the Man Tools Podcast and talked about crime, COVID-19, and Compound Media.

On July 30, 2022, he appeared on fellow comedian Kevin Brennan's podcast Misery Loves Company and discussed his altercation with comedian Geno Bisconte.

Personal life 

In November 2015, Dixon married journalist and performer Mandy Stadtmiller. Their nuptials were shared on stage at the Gotham Comedy Club as part of the New York Comedy Festival. The couple divorced in 2021.

References

External links
Official site 
Pat Dixon on Twitter
Pat Dixon on Facebook
The New York City Crime Report with Pat Dixon on Censored.TV

1970 births
Male actors from New York (state)
American stand-up comedians
American male television actors
Living people
American podcasters
American male comedians
American comedy writers
Comedians from New York (state)
21st-century American comedians